Exiliseptum is a genus of fungi within the Trypetheliaceae family.

References

External links
Exiliseptum at Index Fungorum

Trypetheliaceae